Clarence Eugene Wright (December 11, 1878 – October 29, 1930) was a professional baseball pitcher. He played all or part of four seasons in Major League Baseball from 1901 to 1904.

References

Major League Baseball pitchers
Brooklyn Superbas players
Cleveland Bronchos players
Cleveland Naps players
St. Louis Browns players
Great Falls Indians players
Dayton Old Soldiers players
Boise Fruit Pickers players
Atlanta Crackers players
St. Paul Saints (AA) players
Los Angeles Angels (minor league) players
San Jose (minor league baseball) players
Spokane Indians players
Baseball players from Cleveland
1878 births
1930 deaths